Greece was represented by 33 athletes at the 2010 European Athletics Championships held in Barcelona, Spain. The Greek team did not win a medal at the championships, for the first time in two decades, after the 1990 European Athletics Championships in Split, Yugoslavia.

Participants

References 
Participants list (men)
Participants list (women)

Nations at the 2010 European Athletics Championships
2010
European Athletics Championships